The NAACP Trailblazer Award is presented to a pioneering individual whose theatrical contributions made an outstanding and unique mark in the entertainment industry, therefore, paving the way for others to follow . It is presented part of the NAACP Theatre Awards which commenced in 1991 and presented annually by the Beverly Hills-Hollywood branch of the NAACP to honor outstanding people of color in theatre, following the presentation ceremonies of the NAACP Image Awards.

References

External links
NAACP Theatre Awards

African-American theatre
NAACP Theatre Awards
Awards established in 1991
1991 establishments in the United States